Konare may refer to:

People
 Alpha Oumar Konaré
 Issa Konare
 Adame Ba Konaré
 Amadou Konare
 Soumaïla Konaré

Organizations
 KONARE, left-wing revolutionary organization of Albanian émigré

Places
 Konare, Dobrich Province
 Konare, Stara Zagora Province